Cladoselachidae is an extinct family of holocephalian cartilaginous fishes closely related to Symmoriiformes. They are the only members of the order Cladoselachiformes and were characterized by having an elongated body with a spine in each of the two dorsal fins.

References

Cladoselachiformes, Dictionary of Zoology (1999).
Evolution and paleontology (fish). Animal Aqua.

Devonian sharks
Carboniferous sharks
Permian sharks
Prehistoric cartilaginous fish families
Devonian first appearances
Permian extinctions